The Hurston/Wright Legacy Awards program honors Black writers in the United States and around the globe for literary achievement. Introduced in 2001, the Legacy Award was the first national award presented to Black writers by a national organization of Black writers. It is granted for fiction, nonfiction and poetry, selected in a juried competition.

Each fall, writers and publishers are invited to submit fiction, nonfiction and poetry books published that year. Panels of acclaimed writers serve as judges to select nominees, finalists and winners. A number of merit awards are also presented. Nominees are honored at the Legacy Awards ceremony, held the third Friday in October. The awards ceremony is hosted and organized by the Hurston/Wright Foundation.

Merit awards 
In addition to the Legacy Awards, the Hurston/Wright board of directors may present Merit awards during the annual Legacy Award ceremony.

 The North Star Award pays homage to the significance of the North Star for enslaved Africans, who looked to it as a guide to freedom. The recipients of the award are individuals whose writing and/or service to the writing community serve as a beacon of brilliant accomplishment and as an inspiration to others.

 The Ella Baker Award, named for the heroic civil rights activist, recognizes writers and arts activists for exceptional work that advances social justice.

 The Madam C.J. Walker Award, named for the pioneering entrepreneur and philanthropist, recognizes exceptional innovation in supporting and sustaining Black literature.

Legacy Award winners

Debut Fiction

Fiction

Nonfiction

Poetry

Contemporary Fiction

2022 Nominees

Debut Fiction 
Nominees:

 This Life, Quntos KunQuest (Agate Bolden) 
 The House of Rust, Khadija Abdalla Bajaber (GrayWolf Press) 
 Young Blood, Sifiso Mzobe (Catalyst Press) 
 The Final Revival of Opal and Nev, Dawnie Walton (37 Ink)

Fiction 
Nominees:

 The Trees, Percival Everett (Graywolf Press) 
 Nazaré, J.J. Amaworo Wilson (PM Press)  
 Yellow Wife, Sadeqa Johnson (Simon & Schuster) 
 The Perishing, Natashia Deon (Counterpoint) 
 Rib King, Ladee Hubbard (Amistad, an imprint of HarperCollins) 
 Reconstruction: Stories, Alaya Dawn Johnson (Small Beer Press)

Nonfiction: Memoir/Biography 
Nominees:

 Half in Shadow: The Life and Legacy of Nellie Y. McKay, Shanna Greene Benjamin (The University of North Carolina Press) 
 Bird Uncaged, Marlon Peterson (Bold Type Books) 
 Read Until You Understand, Farah Jasmine Griffin (W. W. Norton & Company)

Nonfiction: Historical/Social/Political 
Nominees:

 Born in Blackness, Howard French (Liveright) 
 We Do This Till We Free Us, Mariame Kaba (Haymarket Books) 
 Liner Notes for the Revolution: The Intellectual Life of Black Feminist Sound, Daphne A. Brooks (Belknap Press: An Imprint of Harvard University Press)

Poetry 
Nominees:

 No Ruined Stone, Shara McCallum (Alice James Books) 
 Tragic City, Clemonce Heard (Anhinga Press) 
 More Perfect Union, Teri Ellen Cross Davis (Mad Creek Books) 
 Sho, Douglas Kearney (Wave Books) 
 I Remember Death by Its Proximity to What I Love, Mahogany L. Browne (Haymarket Books) 
 Everyday Mojo Songs of Earth, Yusef Komunyakaa (Farrar, Straus and Giroux)

2021 Winners and finalists

Debut Fiction 
Winner:

 Remembrance, Rita Woods (Forge Books)

Nominees:

 The Coyotes of Carthage, Steven Wright (Ecco)
 Black Sunday, Tola Rotimi Abraham (Catapult)

Fiction 
Winner:

 Telephone, Percival Everett (Graywolf Press)

Finalists:

 Ring Shout, P. Djèlí Clark (Tor)
 The Freedom Artist, Ben Okri (Akashic Books)

Nominees:

 These Bodies, Morgan Christie (Tolsun Books)
 Book of the Little Axe, Lauren Francis-Sharma (Grove Press)
 Black Bottom Saints, Alice Randall (Amistad Books)

Nonfiction 
Winner:

 Franchise: The Golden Arches in Black America, Marcia Chatelain (Liveright)

Finalists:

 Tacky's Revolt: The Story of an Atlantic Slave War, Vincent Brown (Belknap Press)
 The Address Book: What Street Addresses Reveal About Identity, Race, Wealth, and Power, Deirdre Mask (St. Martin's Press)

Nominees:

 Mediocre: The Dangerous Legacy of White Male America, Ijeoma Oluo (Seal Press)
 The Alchemy of Us: How Humans and Matter Transformed One Another, Ainissa Ramirez (The MIT Press)
 Memorial Drive: A Daughter's Memoir, Natasha Trethewey (Ecco)

Poetry 
Winner:

 Seeing the Body, Rachel Eliza Griffiths (W. W. Norton & Company)

Finalists:

 Fantasia for the Man in Blue, Tommye Blount (Four Way Books)
 Pale Colors in a Tall Field, Carl Phillips (Farrar, Straus and Giroux)

Nominees:

 Jump the Clock, Erica Hunt (Nightboat Books)
 Kontemporary Amerikan Poetry, John Murillo (Four Way Books)
 White Blood: A Lyric of Virginia, Kiki Petrosino (Sarabande Books)

2020 Winners and finalists

Debut Fiction 
Winner:
 Africaville, Jeffrey Colvin (Amistad)
Nominees:

 Avery Colt is a Snake, a Thief, a Liar, Ron A. Austin (Southeast Missouri State University Press)
 As a River, Sion Dayson (Jaded Ibis Press)

Fiction 
Winner:
 A Tall History of Sugar, Curdella Forbes (Akashic Books)
Finalists:

 Gingerbread, Helen Oyeyemi (Riverhead Books)
 The World Doesn’t Require You, Rion Amilcar Scott (Liveright)

Nominees:

 Speaking of Summer, Kalisha Buckhanon (Counterpoint)
 Patsy, Nicole Dennis-Benn (Liveright)
 The Revisioners, Margaret Wilkerson Sexton (Counterpoint)

Nonfiction 
Winner:
 Solitary: My Story of Transformation and Hope, Albert Woodfox (Grove Press)
Finalists:

 Think Black: A Memoir, Clyde Ford (Amistad)
 Wayward Lives, Beautiful Experiments: Intimate Histories of Riotous Black Girls, Troublesome Women, and Queer Radicals, Saidiya Hartman (W. W. Norton & Company)

Nominees:

 Open Season: Legalized Genocide of Colored People, Ben Crump (Amistad)
 We Live for the We: The Political Power of Black Motherhood, Dani McClain (Bold Type Books)
 What Doesn’t Kill You Makes You Blacker: A Memoir in Essays, Damon Young (Ecco)

Poetry 
Winner:
 Exiles of Eden, Ladan Osman (Coffee House Press)
Finalists:

 & More Black, t’ai freedom ford (Augury Books)
 Syncope, Asiya Wadud (Ugly Duckling Presse)

Nominees:

 Night Angler (American Poets Continuum), Geffrey Davis (BOA Editions, LTD)
 1919, Eve L. Ewing (Haymarket Books)
 Library of Small Catastrophes, Alison Rollins (Copper Canyon Press)

2019 Winners and finalists

Fiction 
Winner:

 Heads of the Colored People by Nafissa Thompson-Spires (37Ink/Atria)

Finalists:

A Lucky Man, Jamel Brinkley (Graywolf Press)
She Would Be King, Wayétu Moore (Graywolf Press)

Nominees:

Friday Black, Nana Kwame Adjei-Brenyah (Mariner)
Brother, David Chariandy (Bloomsbury Publishing)
Washington Black, Esi Edugyan (Alfred A. Knopf)

Nonfiction 
Winner:

 May We Forever Stand: A History of the Black National Anthem by Imani Perry (The University of North Carolina Press)

Finalists:

Eloquent Rage: A Black Feminist Discovers Her Superpower, Brittney Cooper (St. Martin’s Press)
Invisible: The Forgotten Story of the Black Woman Lawyer Who Took Down America’s Most Powerful Mobster, Stephen L. Carter (Henry Holt and Company)

Nominees:

Tigerland: 1968-1969 A City Divided, a Nation Torn Apart, and a Magical Season of Healing, Wil Haygood (Alfred A. Knopf)
Heavy: An American Memoir, Kiese Laymon (Scribner)
The New Negro: The Life of Alain Locke, Jeffrey C. Stewart (Oxford University Press)

Poetry 
Winner:

 American Sonnets for My Past and Future Assassin by Terrance Hayes (Penguin Books)

Finalists:

 Mend, Kwoya Fagin Maples (University Press of Kentucky)
 Crosslight for Youngbird, Asiya Wadud (Nightboat Books)

Nominees:

Approaching the Fields, Chanda Feldman (Louisiana State University Press)
DiVida, Monica A. Hand (Alice James Books)
Pardon My Heart, Marcus Jackson (TriQuarterly Books/Northwestern University Press)

2018 Winners and finalists

Debut Fiction 
Winner:

The Talented Ribkins by Ladee Hubbard

Nominees:

What We Lose by Zinzi Clemmons
An Unkindness of Ghosts by Rivers Solomon

Fiction 
Winner:

 Black Moses by Alain Mabanckou

Finalists:

The Woman Next Door by Yewande Omotoso
Sing, Unburied, Sing by Jesmyn Ward

Nominees:

What It Means When a Man Falls from the Sky by Lesley Nneka Arimah
The Tragedy of Brady Sims by Ernest J. Gaines
Dance of the Jakaranda by Peter Kimani

Nonfiction 
Winner:

 The Dawn of Detroit: A Chronicle of Slavery and Freedom in the City of the Straits by Tiya Miles

Finalists:

Cutting School: Privatization, Segregation, and the End of Public Education by Noliwe Rooks
The Cooking Gene: A Journey through African American Culinary History in the Old South by Michael W. Twitty

Nominees:

Cuz: The Life and Times of Michael A. by Danielle Allen
Loving: Interracial Intimacy in America and the Threat to White Supremacy by Sheryll Cashin
Guidebook to Relative Strangers: Journeys into Race, Motherhood, and History by Camille T. Dungy

Poetry 
Winner:

 Semiautomatic by Evie Shockley

Finalists:

 Ordinary Beast by Nicole Sealey
 Incendiary Art by Patricia Smith

Nominees:

City of Bones by Kwame Dawes
Trophic Cascade by Camille T. Dungy
In the Language of My Captor by Shane McCrae

2017 Winners and finalists

Debut Fiction 
Winner:

Damnificados by JJ Amaworo Wilson

Nominees:

Blackass by A. Igoni Barrett
Born on a Tuesday by Elnathan John

Fiction 
Winner:

 The Underground Railroad by Colson Whitehead

Finalists:

 The Loss of All Lost Things by Amina Gautier
 Another Brooklyn by Jacqueline Woodson

Nominees:

 The Mother by Yvvette Edwards 
 The Book of Harlan by Bernice L. McFadden 
 Swing Time by Zadie Smith

Nonfiction 
Winner:

 Hannah Mary Tabbs and the Disembodied Torso: A Tale of Race, Sex, and Violence in America by Kali Nicole Gross

Finalists:

 The Social Life of DNA: Race, Reparations, And Reconciliation After the Genome by Alondra Nelson
 In The Wake: On Blackness and Being by Christina Sharpe

Nominees:

 The Firebrand and the First Lady: Portrait of a Friendship: Pauli Murray, Eleanor Roosevelt, and the Struggle for Social Justice by Patricia Bell-Scott
 Stamped from the Beginning: The Definitive History of Racist Ideas in America by Ibram X. Kendi
 Another Day in the Death of America: A Chronicle of Ten Short Lives by Gary Younge

Poetry 
Winner:

 Bestiary by Donika Kelly

Finalists:

 play dead by francine j. harris
 Thief in the Interior by Phillip B. Williams

Nominees:

 Third Voice by Ruth Ellen Kocher
 Rapture by Sjohnna McCray 
 The Crown Ain't Worth Much by Hanif Willis-Abdurraqib

2016 Winners and finalists

Debut Fiction 
Winner:

Mourner's Bench by Sanderia Faye

Nominees

The Star Side of Bird Hill by Naomi Jackson
The Fishermen by Chigozie Obioma

Fiction 
Winner:

Delicious Foods by James Hannaham

Finalists:

 The Turner House by Angela Flournoy 
 The Lost Child by Caryl Phillips

Nominees:

The Sellout by Paul Beatty
Welcome to Braggsville by T. Geronimo Johnson
Under the Udala Trees by Chinelo Okparanta

Nonfiction 
Winner:

Spectacle: The Astonishing Life of Ota Benga by Pamela Newkirk

Finalists:

 The Light of the World by Elizabeth Alexander
Confronting Black Jacobins: The United States, the Haitian Revolution, and the Origins of the Dominican Republic by Gerald Horne

Nominees:

Where Everybody Looks Like Me: At the Crossroads of America's Black Colleges and Culture by Ron Stodghill
Infectious Madness: The Surprising Science of How We "Catch" Mental Illness by Harriet A. Washington 
The Beast Side: Living and Dying While Black in America by D. Watkins

Poetry 
Winner:

Forest Primeval by Vievee Francis

Finalists:

Honest Engine by Kyle Dargan
Catalog of Unabashed Gratitude by Ross Gay

Nominees:

How to Be Drawn by Terrance Hayes
It Seems Like a Mighty Long Time by Angela Jackson 
Voyage of the Sable Venus by Robin Coste Lewis

2015 Winners and finalists

Fiction
Winner

 The Moor's Account by Laila Lalami

Finalists

 An Untamed State by Roxane Gay
 Land of Love and Drowning by Tiphanie Yanique

Nominees

The Secret History of Las Vegas by Chris Abani
Radiance of Tomorrow by Ishmael Beah
The Orchard of Lost Souls by Nadifa Mohamed

Nonfiction
Winner

 Not For Everyday Use by Elizabeth Nunez

Finalists

 Fire Shut Up in My Bones by Charles M. Blow
 This Nonviolent Stuff'll Get You Killed: How Guns Made the Civil Rights Movement Possible by Charles E. Cobb, Jr.

Nominees

Our Declaration: A Reading of the Declaration of Independence in Defense of Equality by Danielle Allen
Malcolm X at Oxford Union by Saladin Ambar
Losing Our Way by Bob Herbert

Poetry
Winner

 Citizen: An American Lyric by Claudia Rankine

Finalists

 Revising the Storm by Geffrey Davis
 King Me by Roger Reeves

Nominees

We Don't Know Any Gangsters by Brian Gilmore
Digest by Gregory Pardlo
The Essential Hits of Shorty Bon Bon by Willie Perdomo

2014 Winners and finalists

Fiction 
Winner

 We Need New Names by NoViolet Bulawayo

Finalists

 See Now Then by Jamaica Kincaid
 The Residue Years by Mitchell S. Jackson

Nominees

 Every Boy Should Have a Man by Preston L. Allen
 The Good Lord Bird by James McBride
 The Gospel According to Cane by Courttia Newland

Nonfiction 
Winner

 Ebony & Ivory by Craig Wilder

Finalists

 Kansas City Lightning: The Rise and Times of Charlie Parker by Stanley Crouch
 Men We Reaped by Jesmyn Ward

Nominees

 Nine Years Under: Coming of Age in an Inner-City Funeral Home by Sheri Booker
 The March on Washington: Jobs, Freedom  and the Forgotten History of Civil Rights by William P. Jones
 Searching for Zion: The Quest for Home in the African Diaspora by Emily Raboteau

Poetry 
Winner

 Darktown Follies by Amaud Jamaul Johnson

Finalists

 Hemming the Water by Yona Harvey
 The Cineaste: Poems by A. Van Jordan

Nominees

 Silverchest by Carl Phillips
 The Big Smoke by Adrian Matejka
 What We Ask of Flesh by Remica L. Bingham

2013 Winners and finalists

Fiction 
Winner

 Half-Blood Blues by Esi Edugyan

Nominees

 Elsewhere, California by Dana Johnson
 Gathering of Waters by Bernice L. McFadden
 The Cutting Season by Attica Locke
 The Twelve Tribes of Hattie by Ayana Mathis
 A Cupboard Full of Coats by Yvvette Edwards

Nonfiction 
Winner

 The Price of the Ticket: Barack Obama and Rise and Decline of Black Politics by Fredrick Harris

Nominees

 American Lynching by Ashraf H. A. Rushdy
 Exit: The Endings That Set Us Free by Sara Lawrence-Lightfoot
 Go-Go Live: The Musical Life and Death of a Chocolate City by Natalie Hopkinson
 Help Me To Find My People: The African American Search for Family Lost in Slavery by Heather Andrea Williams
 There Was a Country: A Personal History of Biafra by Chinua Achebe

Poetry 
Winner

 The Collected Poems of Lucille Clifton 1965-2010 by Lucille Clifton

Nominees

 But a Storm is Blowing from Paradise by Lillian-Yvonne Bertram
 me and Nina by Monica Hand

2012 Winners and finalists

Fiction 
Winner

 Mr. Fox by Helen Oyeyemi

Finalists

 Silver Sparrow by Tayari Jones
 Zone One by Colson Whitehead

Nominees

 Crossbones by Nuruddin Farah
 Salvage the Bones by Jesmyn Ward
 You Are Free by Danzy Senna

Nonfiction 
Winner

 Courage to Dissent: Atlanta and the Long History of the Civil Rights Movement by Tomiko Brown-Nagin

Finalists

 Harlem is Nowhere: A Journey to the Mecca of Black America by Sharifa Rhodes-Pitts
 One Day I Will Write About This Place by Binyavanga Wainaina

Nominees

 My Long Trip Home: A Family Memoir by Mark Whitaker
 Sister Citizen: Shame, Stereotypes, and Black Women in America by Melissa V. Harris-Perry

Poetry 
Winner

 the new black by Evie Shockley

Nominees

 Kingdom Animalia by Aracelis Girmay
 Life on Mars by Tracy K. Smith

2011 Winners and finalists

Fiction 
Winner

 Before You Suffocate Your Own Fool Self by Danielle Evans

Finalists

 Glorious by Bernice L. McFadden
 Wench by Dolen Perkins-Valdez

Nominees

 How to Escape from a Leper Colony: A Novella and Stories by Tiphanie Yanique
 How to Read the Air by Dinaw Mengestu
 Wading Home: A Novel of New Orleans by Rosalyn Story

Nonfiction 
Winner

 The Warmth of Other Suns: The Epic Story of America’s Great Migration by Isabel Wilkerson

Finalists

 Root and Branch: Charles Hamilton Houston, Thurgood Marshall, and the Struggle to End Segregation by Rawn James Jr.
 The Indignant Generation: A Narrative History of African American Writers and Critics, 1934-1960 by Lawrence Jackson

Nominees

 Brainwashed: Challenging the Myth of Black Inferiority by Tom Burrell
 John Oliver Killens: A Life of Black Literary Activism by Keith Gilyard
 Losing My Cool: How a Father’s Love and 15,000 Books Beat Hip-hop Culture by Thomas Chatterton Williams

Poetry 
Winner

 Crave Radiance: New and Selected Poems 1990-2010 by Elizabeth Alexander

Nominees

 Lighthead by Terrance Hayes
 Skin, Inc: Identity Repair Poems by Thomas Sayers Ellis

2010 Winners and finalists

Fiction
Winner

 I Am Not Sidney Poitier: A Novel by Percival Everett

Finalists

 Blonde Roots by Bernardine Evaristo
Sag Harbor by Colson Whitehead

Nominees

Big Machine by Victor Lavalle
Black Water Rising by Attica Locke
The Trial of Robert Mugabe by Chielo Zona Eze

Nonfiction
Winner

 Thelonious Monk: The Life and Times of an American Original by Robin Kelley

Finalists

 Freedom by Any Means: True Stories of Cunning and Courage on the Underground Railroad by Betty DeRamus
Sweet Thunder: The Life and Times of Sugar Ray Robinson by Wil Haygood

Nominees

More than Just Race: Being Black and Poor in the Inner City by William Julius Wilson
Remembering Scottsboro: The Legacy of an Infamous Trial by James A. Miller
The Breakthrough: Politics and Race in the Age of Obama by Gwen Ifill

Poetry
Winners

 Sonata Mulattica: Poems by Rita Dove
 Liberation Narratives: New and Collected Poems by Haki R. Madhubuti

Nominees

Cooling Board: A Long-Playing Poem by Mitchell L. H. Douglas
Gospel by Samiya Bashir

2009 Winners and finalists

Fiction
Winner

 Say You're One of Them by Uwem Akpan

Finalists

 Holding Pattern: Stories by Jeffery Renard Allen
Where the Line Bleeds by Jesmyn Ward

Nominees

Blood Colony by Tananarive Due
Song Yet Sung by James McBride
Stand the Storm by Breena Clarke

Nonfiction
Winner

 Incognegro: A Memoir of Exile and Apartheid by Frank B. Wilderson

Finalists

 Ida: A Sword Among Lions: Ida B. Wells and the Campaign Against Lynching by Paula J. Giddings
 The Beautiful Struggle: A Father, Two Sons, and an Unlikely Road to Manhood by Ta-Nehisi Coates

Nominees

Mr. and Mrs. Prince: How an Extraordinary Eighteenth- Century Family Moved Out of Slavery and into Legend by Gretchen Holbrook Gerzina
Somebody Scream: Rap Music’s Rise to Prominence in the Aftershock of Black Power by Marcus Reeves
The Agitator’s Daughter: A Memoir of Four Generations of One Extraordinary African- American Family by Sheryll Cashin

Poetry
The Headless Saints by Myronn Hardy
Please by Jericho Brown
Warhorses by Yusef Komunyakaa

2008 Winners and finalists

Debut Fiction
Winner

 She's Gone by Kwame Dawes

Nominees

Like Trees, Walking by Ravi Howard
Them by Nathan McCall

Fiction
Winner

 The Brief Wondrous Life of Oscar Wao by Junot Diaz

Finalists

Someone Knows My Name by Lawrence Hill
The Story of the Cannibal Woman by Maryse Condé

Nominees

Measuring Time: A Novel by Helon Habila
The Guyanese Wander by Jan Carew
The Opposite House by Helen Oyeyemi

Nonfiction
Winner

 Brother, I'm Dying by Edwige Danticat

Finalists

 Dreams of Africa in Alabama: The Slave Ship Clotilda and the Story of the Last Africans Brought to America by Sylviane A. Diouf
On the Courthouse Lawn: Confronting the Legacy of Lynching in the Twenty-first Century by Sherrilyn Ifill

Nominees

Infidel by Ayaan Hirsi Ali
The Deepest South: The United States, Brazil and the African Slave Trade by Gerald Horne
The N Word: Who Can Say It, Who Shouldn’t, and Why by Jabari Asim

Poetry
Winner

 Bouquet of Hungers by Kyle G. Dargan

Nominees

Conversion by Remica L. Bingham
Quantum Lyrics by A. Van Jordan

2007 Winners and finalists

Debut Fiction
Winner

 Ancestor Stones by Aminatta Forna

Nominees

Get Down: Stories by Asali Solomon
Unburnable by Marie-Elena John

Fiction
Winner

 All Aunt Hagar's Children by Edward P. Jones

Finalists

Dominion: A Novel by Calvin Baker
Half of a Yellow Sun by Chimamanda Ngozi Adichie

Nominees

Jump at the Sun by Kim McLarin
Nowhere is a Place by Bernice L. McFadden
Wizard of the Crow by Ngũgĩ wa Thiong'o

Nonfiction
Winner

 Unbowed: A Memoir by Wangari Maathai

Finalists

The Last 'Darky': Bert Williams, Black-on-Black Minstrelsy, and the African Diaspora by Louis Chude-Sokei
The Skin Between Us: A Memoir of Race, Beauty, and Belonging by Kym Ragusa

Nominees

Before the Legend: The Rise of Bob Marley by Christopher John Farley
BookMarks: Reading in Black and White by Karla F.C. Holloway
The River Flows On: Black Resistance, Culture, and Identity Formation in Early America by Walter C. Rucker

Poetry
Teahouse of the Almighty by Patricia Smith
The Architecture of Language by Quincy Troupe
Wind in a Box by Terrance Hayes

2006 Winners and finalists

Debut Fiction
Winner

 Freshwater Road by Denise Nicholas

Nominees

Tropical Fish: Tales from Entebbe by Doreen Baingana
Upstate by Kalisha Buckhanon

Fiction
Winner

 My Jim: A Novel by Nancy Rawles

Finalists

Pride of Carthage by David Anthony Durham
The Untelling by Tayari Jones

Nominees

Dancing in the Dark by Caryl Phillips
Joplin’s Ghost by Tananarive Due
Third Girl from the Left by Martha Southgate

Nonfiction
Winner

 Mirror to America: The Autobiography of John Hope Franklin by John Hope Franklin

Finalists

Bright Boulevards, Bold Dreams: The Story of Black Hollywood by Donald Bogle
Creating Their Own Image: The History of African-American Women Artists by Lisa E. Farrington

Nominees

My Face is Black is True: Callie House and the Struggle for Ex-Slave Reparations by Mary Frances Berry
Why I Hate Abercrombie & Fitch: Essays on Race and Sexuality by Dwight A. McBride
Worrying the Line: Black Women Writers, Lineage, and Literary Tradition by Cheryl A. Wall

Contemporary Fiction
Winner

 The Long Mile: The Shango Mysteries by Clyde W. Ford

Nominees

Love on the Dotted Line by David E. Talbert
Who Does She Think She is? by Benilde Little

2005 Winners and finalists

Debut Fiction 
Winner

 GraceLand by Chris Abani

Nominees

 The Darkest Child by Delores Phillips
 The Second Life of Samuel Tyne by Esi Edugyan

Fiction 
Winner

 Who Slashed Celanire's Throat? by Maryse Condé

Finalists

 The Dew Breaker by Edwige Danticat
The Madonna of Excelsior by Zakes Mda

Nominees

American Desert by Percival Everett
Links by Nuruddin Farah
The Man in My Basement by Walter Mosley

Nonfiction
Winner

 Warrior Poet: A Biography of Audre Lorde by Alexis De Veaux

Finalists

 A Continent for the Taking by Howard French
 The End of Blackness by Debra J. Dickerson

Nominees

Bone to Pick: Of Forgiveness, Reconciliation, Reparation and Revenge by Ellis Cose
The Black Interior by Elizabeth Alexander
The Failures of Integration: How Race and Class Are Undermining the American Dream by Sheryll Cashin

Contemporary Fiction
A Woman's Worth by Tracy Price-Thompson
Bling by Erica Kennedy
Shifting Through Neutral by Bridgett M. Davis

2004 Winners and finalists

Debut Fiction
Winner

 Purple Hibiscus by Chimamanda Ngozi Adichie

Finalist

 A Place Between Stations by Stephanie Allen
 Knee-Deep in Wonder by April Reynolds

Nominee

Daughter by Asha Bandele
Drinking Coffee Elsewhere by ZZ Packer
Getting Mother’s Body by Suzan-Lori Parks

Fiction
Winner

 Hunting in Harlem by Mat Johnson

Finalists

 A Distant Shore by Caryl Phillips
 The Polished Hoe by Austin Clarke

Nominees

Hottentot Venus by Barbara Chase-Riboud
The Known World by Edward P. Jones
The Salt Roads by Nalo Hopkinson

Nonfiction
Winner

 In Black and White: The Life of Sammy Davis, Jr. by Wil Haygood

Finalists

 Appropriating Blackness: Performance and the Politics of Authenticity by E. Patrick Johnson
 Mandela, Mobutu and Me by Lynne Duke

Nominees

Always Wear Joy: My Mother Bold and Beautiful by Susan Fales-Hill
Somebody’s Someone by Regina Louise
Wrapped in Rainbows: The Life of Zora Neale Hurston by Valerie Boyd

2003 Winners and finalists

Debut Fiction 
Winner

 Leaving Atlanta by Tayari Jones

Finalists

 A Little Piece Of Sky by Nicole Bailey-Williams
 Fifth Born by Zelda Lockhart

Nominees

 Gigantic by Marc Nesbitt
 River Woman by Donna Hemans
 Song of the Water Saints by Nelly Rosario

Fiction 
Winner

 The Heart of Redness by Zakes Mda

Finalists

 Douglass’ Women by Jewell Parker Rhodes
 The Ecstatic by Victor Lavalle

Nominees

 Discretion by Elizabeth Nunez
 Water Street by Crystal Wilkinson
 Without a Name and Under the Tongue by Yvonne Vera

Nonfiction 
Winner

 Forgotten Readers: Recovering the Lost History of African American Literary Societies by Elizabeth McHenry

Finalists

 Passed On: African American Mourning Stories by Karla FC Holloway
 The Herndons: An Atlanta Family by Carole Merritt

Nominees

 American Skin: Pop Culture, Big Business, and the End of White America by Leon E. Wynter
 Ralph Ellison: Emergence of Genius by Lawrence Jackson

2002 Winners and finalists

Debut Fiction 
Winner

 Gabriel’s Story by David Anthony Durham

Finalists

 Greenwichtown by Joyce Palmer
 The Red Moon by Kuwana Haulsey

Nominees

 Breathing Room by Patricia Elam
 Break Any Woman Down by Dana Johnson
 The Dying Ground by Nichelle D. Tramble

Fiction 
Winner

 Erasure by Percival Everett

Finalists

 Bombingham by Anthony Grooms
 October Suite by Maxine Clair

Nominees

 Fearless Jones by Walter Mosley
 He Sleeps by Reginald McKnight
 The Warmest December by Bernice L. McFadden

Nonfiction 
Winner

 In the Shadow of a Saint:  A Son’s Journey to Understand His Father’s Legacy by Ken Wiwa

Finalists

 On Her Own Ground: The Life and Times of Madam C.J. Walker by A’Lelia Bundles
 The Undiscovered Paul Robeson: An Artist’s Journey, 1898–1939 by Paul Robeson Jr.

Nominees

 Impossible Witnesses: Truths, Abolitionism, and Slave Testimony by Dwight McBride
 Raising Fences: A Black Man’s Love Story by Michael Datcher
 Salvation: Black People and Love by bell hooks

References

External links
Hurston/Wright Legacy Award, official website

Awards established in 2004
2004 establishments in the United States
American fiction awards
American non-fiction literary awards
First book awards
Zora Neale Hurston